Marsi is a tribe of ancient Italy.

Marsi may also refer to:

 Marsi (Germanic), a tribe of ancient Germany
 Counts of Marsi, counts in Southern Italy from the 11th and 12th centuries AD
 Bishop of Marsi of the Diocese of Marsi, a former central Italian Roman Catholic bishopric
 Marsi Gallery, a gallery in Thailand

Surname
 Francesca Marsi (1926-1989), Italian actress
 Márk Marsi (born 1973), Hungarian fencer
 Paolo Marsi (1440-1481), Italian humanist

Given name
 Marsi Paribatra (1931-2013), Thai princess

See also 
 Mars I, the innermost moon of Mars
 Mars 1 (disambiguation)
 Marcy (disambiguation)